Gun Smugglers is a 1948 American Western directed by Frank McDonald.  The film is a Tim Holt B Western wherein Holt serves as a scout for the army in search of some smuggled gattling guns.

Tim Holt plays himself rather than a character.

Plot
A ranger tracks down agents who steal weapons from the army and sell them to a foreign power.

Cast
 Tim Holt as Tim Holt
 Richard Martin as Chito Rafferty
 Martha Hyer as Judy Davis
 Gary Gray as Danny Reeves
 Paul Hurst as Sergeant L. McHugh 'Hasty' Jones
 Douglas Fowley as Steve Reeves
 Robert Warwick as Colonel Davis
 Don Haggerty as Sheriff Schurslock 
 Frank Sully as Corporal Clancy 
 Robert Bray as Henchman Dodge

Production
The film was originally called Gun Runners. Holt was meant to make Stagecoach Kid first but that was pushed back so he could make this.

References

External links

 
 
 

1948 films
1948 Western (genre) films
American Western (genre) films
1940s English-language films
American black-and-white films
Films directed by Frank McDonald
RKO Pictures films
Films scored by Paul Sawtell
1940s American films